Tritón is a Mexican magazine dedicated to news, books and information on swimming, diving and water polo.

See also
List of Mexican magazines

References

External links
Official site 

Magazines published in Mexico
Spanish-language magazines
Sports magazines
Magazines with year of establishment missing